The  is a Shinkansen high-speed train type operated by West Japan Railway Company (JR-West) on the San'yō Shinkansen line in Japan since 1997.

Overview
The general design concept was overseen by German industrial designer Alexander Neumeister. The running gear utilizes computer-controlled active suspension for a smoother, safer ride, and yaw dampers are fitted between cars for improved stability. Each train cost an estimated 5 billion yen, and only nine were built. It used biomimicry to reduce energy consumption by 15%, increase speeds by 10% and reduce noise levels while increasing passenger comfort. This was done by making the train's front have the shape of a kingfisher's beak.

6-car 500-900 WIN350 set

This was a prototype for the Series 500.

16-car W sets
First announced by JR-West in September 1994, the first set was delivered for testing in 1995, entering passenger service in March 1997. The entire fleet of nine sets was delivered by 1998. Besides the premium Nozomi services, 16-car trains were also used on Hikari Rail Star services during the busy holiday periods.

With the steady increase in the number of N700 Series Shinkansen since 2007, the 500 series were gradually retired from the Nozomi services. The last 500 series Nozomi run took place on 28 February 2010.

Formation

Cars 8 to 10 were "Green" (first class) cars. Cars 5 and 13 each had one "T"-style current collector.

Interior

8-car V sets (500-7000 series)

Eight of the original nine 500 series sets were modified and shortened to eight cars between 2008 and 2010, and were cascaded to Sanyo Shinkansen Kodama workings, replacing the earlier 0 series sets. The first reformed eight-car set was unveiled to the press on 28 March 2008, and the trains entered service on twelve daily Kodama runs from 1 December 2008.

Formation
, the fleet consists of eight eight-car sets (V2 to V9) formed as follows, with car 1 at the Hakata end.

Cars 2 and 7 each have one single-arm pantograph.

Interior
Passenger accommodation consists of 3+2 abreast unidirectional seating, with 2+2 abreast seating in car 6 (former Green car). Between October and December 2013, cars 4 and 5 are also scheduled to have the original seating removed and replaced with new 2+2 abreast seating, the same as used in the Hikari Rail Star 700 series trainsets.

All passenger saloons on the 8-car 500 series trains are no-smoking, with new smoking compartments installed in cars 3 and 7. Cars 1, 3, 5, and 7 are equipped with toilets.

Special liveries

Since 7 November 2015, set V2 runs in a special "500 Type Eva" livery as part of the "Shinkansen:Evangelion Project" tie-up project to mark the 40th anniversary of the Sanyo Shinkansen and the 20th anniversary of Neon Genesis Evangelion. Initially planned to operate until March 2017, this livery was extended until 13 May 2018. From 24 February until 7 May 2018, the 500 series car preserved at the Kyoto Railway Museum was exhibited in the "500 Type Eva" livery.

In March 2018, JR West announced the launch of a special "Hello Kitty" themed 500 series train on Sanyo Shinkansen Kodama services. The train entered service on 30 June 2018.

Interior

Preserved examples

Car 521-1, formerly the front car of set W1, is preserved at the Kyoto Railway Museum, which opened in April 2016. This car was exhibited in the "500 Type Eva" livery between 24 February and 7 May 2018.
Car 522-1, formerly the end car of set W1, is preserved at the Hitachi Rail Kasado factory in Kudamatsu, Yamaguchi, in Autumn 2015.

See also
 List of high speed trains

References

External links

 JR-West 500 series Kodama 
 Nippon Sharyo information 

Shinkansen train series
West Japan Railway Company
Hitachi multiple units
Train-related introductions in 1997
Passenger trains running at least at 300 km/h in commercial operations
25 kV AC multiple units
Kawasaki multiple units
Nippon Sharyo multiple units
Kinki Sharyo multiple units
Electric multiple units of Japan